Siddipet Police Commissionerate is a city police force with primary responsibilities in law enforcement and investigation within Siddipet, Telangana.

The Commissionerate was officially inaugurated along with the new 21 districts and with 4 other new commissionerates in the state on 11th october 2016. on the eve of Dasara.

Jurisdiction 
Siddipet Commissionerate consists of 3 Divisions i.e. Siddipet, Gajwel and Husnabad.

There are 6 Circles viz.

 Siddipet Rural
 Dubbaka
 Gajwel Rural
 Thoguta
 Husnabad
 Cherial

There are 26 Law and Order Police Stations under this commissionerate.

Latest 
On 20 June 2021 the Chief Minister of the state K.Chandra shekar Rao had inaugurated the Newly constructed Commissionerate-cum-District Police Head quarters along with the newly built Integrated Collectorate complex. It was built in 19 acres of land with Rs.19 Crores.

References 

Telangana Police
Government agencies established in 2016
2016 establishments in Telangana
Siddipet district